Aubrey is a 1980 British cartoon series. There was just one season of 39 cartoons in colour, each lasting six minutes. They were produced by D. P. Films (Derek Phillips films) for ITV channel. The cartoons were directed by Derek Phillips, who also produced them. The animators were Martin Chatfield, Andy Wagner, Rose Welsh and Joanne Gooding.

Aubrey was a small round orange character with a huge nose who had many different adventures. Sometimes an inventor, he would need to make things in his shed, to the accompaniment of lots of loud hammering. The artwork, animation and music were simplistic but Aubrey was a popular series. Episode titles included: "Aubrey's Boat", "Aubrey's Garden", "Aubrey's Framed", "Aubrey and the Beanstalk", "Aubrey Discovers Soap", "Aubrey's Apple Tree", "Aubrey's Fire Engine", "Aubrey's Treasure", "Aubrey's Radio", "Aubrey's Cruise", "Aubrey Plays Golf", and "In Time".

So far, only six episodes of Aubrey have been released on DVD.

1980 British television series debuts
1980 British television series endings
British children's animated adventure television series
1980s British animated television series